The Torneio Internacional de Tênis Campos do Jordão (previously known as the Credicard Citi MasterCard Tennis Cup) was a professional tennis tournament played on outdoor hard courts. It was part of the International Tennis Federation (ITF) Women's Circuit and the Association of Tennis Professionals (ATP) Challenger Tour. It was held annually at the Campos do Jordão Tênis Clube de Turismo in Campos do Jordão, Brazil, from 2001 to 2017.

Past finals

Men's singles

Women's singles

Men's doubles

Women's doubles

External links
Official website
ITF search

ATP Challenger Tour
Hard court tennis tournaments
MasterCard Tennis Cup
ITF Women's World Tennis Tour
Recurring sporting events established in 2001
Tennis tournaments in Brazil
Recurring sporting events disestablished in 2017
Defunct sports competitions in Brazil